Ko Ji-yong (born July 1, 1980) is a South Korean singer and businessman. He was a member of Sechs Kies, a first generation K-pop idol dance group which disbanded in 2000 but reunited in 2016. Unlike most of the other members, Ko left the entertainment industry and started his own company. He made his first television appearance in years when he appeared at Sechs Kies' reunion special on Infinite Challenge. Due to his family and work commitments he did not sign a contract with the group's new label YG Entertainment or promote with them as a performer but is considered to be part of the group. From January 2017 to May 2019, he and his son appeared on the reality show The Return of Superman.

Early life 
A native of Seoul, Ko was elementary schoolmates with future Sechs Kies bandmate Kang Sung-hun and g.o.d member Son Ho-young. He lost contact with Kang after the latter went to the United States to attend high school.

Career

Sechs Kies and retirement 
Ko was recruited by Kang to join the boy band he and his high school friend Eun Ji-won were forming. The group was eventually named Sechs Kies and debuted on April 15, 1997. Ko was the second youngest member.

Until the time the group disbanded in 2000, he was greatly loved by fans for his handsome looks and singing voice. Unlike other members, he did not continue his career as a solo singer but he was cast as a host in an internet broadcast and as an actor in a television drama. However, Ko chose to leave the entertainment industry to start his own business.

In 2008, fellow Sechs Kies member and leader Eun Ji-won appeared in the entertainment program Come to Play and remarked that he had not seen Ko since the group's disbandment. Fellow vocalist Jang Su-won revealed on Happy Together in 2014 that he was in contact with Ko and confirmed that he was running his own business.

Reunion 
In 2016, Sechs Kies reunited after their disbandment in 2000 through the variety show Infinite Challenge. Ko, who had left the entertainment business permanently after the disbandment to pursue a new career, surprised the members of SechsKies as well as all the fans by appearing at the reunion concert and performing their hit song "Couple". After Infinite Challenge aired, Sechs Kies earned many more fans; their hit songs ranked high in music charts and “Couple” was seen in 11th place in Music Bank. The group officially reunited and signed a group contract with YG Entertainment in May that year. However, Ko was the only one who did not sign, having been the only member to completely depart from the entertainment industry.

On July 18, Ko made a public appearance as a sponsor for a charity basketball event and held interviews with the media for the first time in 16 years. He stated that he is now living as a "half-celebrity" since appearing on Infinite Challenge. On November 30, it was announced that Ko and his son would be joining the cast of The Return of Superman. He said although he cannot participate in current Sechs Kies group activities as a family man, he has determined to keep his promise to "create opportunities to be with fans through activities he can participate." Also as he was unable to spend more time with his son, he hopes to make many memories with him through the program.
In May 2019, Ko announced that he and his son would be leaving the cast of 'The Return of Superman'.

Personal life 
On December 13, 2013, Ko married Heo Yang-im, a professor of family medicine and a doctor. The couple have a son, Ko Seung-jae, born on October 6, 2014.

Discography

Studio albums
 School Byeolgok (학원별곡) (1997)
 Welcome To The Sechskies Land (1997)
 Road Fighter (1998)
 Special Album (1998)
 Com’Back (1999)

Other albums
 Ali Baba and the 40 Thieves Musical OST (1998)
 1020 Mix (1999)
 Sechskies Live Concert (1999)
 Blue Note (2000)

Music credits

Filmography

Film

Variety show

Awards

References

1980 births
K-pop singers
Living people
People from Seoul
DSP Media artists
South Korean male idols
Sechs Kies members
Singers from Seoul
South Korean male singers
South Korean pop singers
Anyang Arts High School alumni